Gevherhan Sultan may refer to Ottoman princesses:

 Gevherhan Hatun (daughter of Mehmed II)  Ottoman princess;
 Gevhermüluk Sultan (daughter of Bayezid II) Ottoman princess;
 Gevhermelik Hatun (daughter of Cem Sultan) Ottoman princess;
 Gevherşah Hanımsultan (daughter of Ayşe Sultan) Ottoman princess;
 Gevherhan Sultan (daughter of Selim I) Ottoman princess;
 Gevherhan Sultan (daughter of Selim II)  Ottoman princess;
 Gevherhan Sultan (daughter of Ahmed I)  Ottoman princess;
 Gevherhan Sultan (daughter of Murad IV) Ottoman princess;
 Gevherhan Sultan (daughter of Ibrahim)  Ottoman princess;
 Gevherhan Sultan (daughter of Mehmed IV) Ottoman princess;
 Gevheri Sultan, Ottoman princess